Jaidev is a 1998 Indian Kannada language action drama film directed by H. Vasu who also wrote the screenplay for a story by M. D. Hasham. It film has musical score by Rajesh Ramanath. The film stars Jaggesh in the titular role alongside an ensemble cast which includes Charulatha, Srinath, Doddanna, Ashok, Sumithra and Gurudatt. The film was produced by Sa Ra Govindu in the banner of Thanu Chithra.

The film narrates the story of two brothers, Dhanpal and Jaipal, who have supreme authority over their dead brother-in-law's wealth. However, when a stage comes that they are unable to keep their authority due to their brother-in-law's will which states that his son will be the next heir, they hire Jaidev, a young good doer to play that role. He is hoodwinked into believing that they are doing it for their sister. What happens later forms the crux of the story.

Cast 
 Jaggesh ... Jaidev"Devu"
 Charulatha ... Pavithra"Pavi"
 Srinath ... Lawyer Shiva
 Doddanna ... Dhanpal
 Sumithra ... Jaidev's mother
 Gurudatt ... Jaipal
 Ashok
 Krishne Gowda
 Harish Roy
 Pramila Joshai
 Honnavalli Krishna

Soundtrack 

The soundtrack album comprises 6 songs composed by Rajesh Ramanath.

Others 
The film was cleared with a U Certificate from the Censor Board after deletion of a few dialogues.

Sri Ganesh Video purchased the video rights of the film.

References

External links 
 Jaidev at Gaana
 Jaidev at Saavn
 Jaidev at iTunes

1998 films
1990s Kannada-language films